Michael David Coper  (27 April 1946 – 13 April 2019) was an Australian legal academic, one of Australia's leading constitutional lawyers, author, and one of the founders of the law school at the University of New South Wales.

Early years
Coper attended Cranbrook from 1950 to 1963.

Career
Coper studied law at the University of Sydney. He was a Fulbright Senior Scholar at the University of Virginia in 1978.

Coper was one of the founders of the law school at the University of New South Wales in 1971 and taught law at the University until 1987.

Coper was associated with the Australian trucking industry in the 1980s as the legal member of the NSW Road Freight Transport Industry Council. In 1988 he was appointed to the Inter-State Commission, producing several reports on the Australian waterfront and interstate land transport. Coper was appointed as Chair of the TruckSafe Industry Accreditation Council in 1996.

Coper came to prominence with his prize-winning 1983 book Freedom of Interstate Trade under the Australian Constitution, which was influential in the High Court's change of direction five years later in the landmark case of Cole v Whitfield, in which Professor Coper also appeared as counsel. His 1987 book Encounters with the Australian Constitution was received to great acclaim, as was the project he conceived and co-edited to fruition in 2001, the comprehensive Oxford Companion to the High Court of Australia.

In 1995 Coper was Professor of Constitutional Law at the Australian National University. Coper was the Dean of the College of Law at the Australian National University from 1998 to 2012.
Chair of the Council of Australian Law Deans (2005–2007), Vice President of the International Association of Law Schools (2011–2014), a member of the American Law Institute and a Foundation Fellow of the Australian Academy of Law.

Works
  
 
  which was influential in the Australian High Court case of Cole v Whitfield

Awards and honours
 2017 – Coper was appointed as Professor Emeritus of the Australian National University
 2018 – Officer in the Order of Australia for distinguished service to legal education, and to the law, as an academic, author and administrator, through advisory roles, and to safety standards in the transport industry.
 2018 – A book of essays was published in his honour Encounters with constitutional interpretation and legal education : essays in honour of Michael Coper
 2019 – Doctor of Laws honoris causa from University of New South Wales

Personal life 
Coper is the father of Australian political campaigner Ed Coper.

References

External links
Michael Coper interviewed by Garry Sturgess

1946 births
2019 deaths
20th-century Australian lawyers
Officers of the Order of Australia
Fellows of the Australian Academy of Law
Academic staff of the Australian National University
Academic staff of the University of New South Wales
University of Sydney alumni
People educated at Cranbrook School, Sydney